Manvi is a City in the Raichur district of the Indian state of Karnataka. It is the municipal headquarters of the Manvi taluk. Manvi Police Station stood fifth in the list of top 10 best police station across the country.

Manvi is governed by a municipal corporation. It is home to a number of religious sites including: Hazrat Syed Shah Sabzali Sattar Quadri Ra, Mallikarjunn Swamy Temple, and Manvi. Manvi is associated with a number of religious philosophers of Hinduism, such as the 18th-century the Madhva-follower and dasa Sri Jagannatha Dasa. It is also home to a number of archaeological and historical sites, such as "Fort On The Top Of The Hill", Ancient Bridges, and the Jumma-Masjid Mosque (Shahi-Masjid), an ancient mosque with outer works of black stone from the Bhamani or Adilshahi periods. The said Masque is maintaining by the Khazi Ahmed Hussain sons until his ancestral.

Geography
Manvi is located in the Raichur district of Karnataka State, India. It has an administrative-limits area of 10 square kilometers (3.86 square miles) at an average elevation of 362 meters (1187 ft).

Demographics
As of the 2011 India census, Manvi's population was 51% male and 49% female. The town has an average literacy rate of 47%, lower than the national average of 59.5%; male literacy is 55% and female literacy is 39%. In Manvi, 17% of the population is under six years old.

Politics
 The current Member of the Legislative Assembly (MLA) is (Raja Venkatappa Nayaka).
 The current representative in the Lok Sabha from the Raichur constituency is (Raja Amaresh Nayaka).
 The current Member of the Legislative Council (MLC) is (Shri Sharangouda Bayyapur).
 The current President of the Karnataka Rajya Raitha Sangha is (Chamarasa Malipatil).

Transport
Manvi is connected by road to Bangalore, Hubli, Hyderabad, and other major cities. The nearest airport is in Hyderabad.
Manvi has huge number of transport by lorry and DCMs and is controlled by Manvi Lorry association 
 The current President of the (Manvi Lorry Association) is (Amjad Khan).
Auto rickshaws are used as transport inside the city. The Karnataka State Road Transport Corporation (KSRTC) runs a bus service to other cities and villages. There are also various other private bus services.

Raichur is the nearest railway station to Manvi. Raichur is served by a major rail line with trains connecting to all major parts of India.

New Railway line, Munirabad-Mahbubnagar railway line which will pass through Manvi. Through this railway line Manvi will be connected to rest of the country.

References

Archaeological sites in Karnataka
Cities and towns in Raichur district
Taluks of Karnataka